Library Village is one of many historic neighborhoods in Toledo, Ohio; the neighborhood  is named for the historic West Toledo Branch Library, located just off Sylvania Avenue at Willys Parkway.

"West Toledo Branch opened in its present building in 1930. In 2001 the branch remodeled and expanded. This library is such a beloved community center that the entire neighborhood is called Library Village."

Gallery

References 

Neighborhoods in Toledo, Ohio